Watergardens Town Centre is a super regional shopping centre located in Taylors Lakes, 24 kilometres north-west of Melbourne, Victoria. It opened in 1997, and is owned by the Queensland Investment Corporation.

History
The site was purchased by the Queensland Investment Corporation (QIC) in February 1995, with construction commencing in October 1996. The centre opened as Watergardens Shopping Centre on 29 September 1997 with 100 speciality stores: the name Watergardens was reportedly chosen in homage of the adjacent Taylors Creek.

Watergardens railway station was also opened in 2002 following the extension of M-Train St Albans services to Sydenham, with QIC purchasing the naming rights to the station.

A further expansion to the centre was announced in 2003, adding a further  of retail space south of the complex. Construction commenced in December 2005 and was originally planned to open in April 2007, but was delayed until May of that year. The expansion included Big W, JB Hi-fi and a second Safeway supermarket. A record crowd attended the centre on 23 December 2007, with more than 45,000 customers attending the centre.

An expansion of the centre was undertaken between 2019 and 2020, resulting in the closure of the Coles (previously Bi-lo) store. The expansion, known as 'The Marketplace', was completed in 2020 and included an Aldi supermarket.

As part of nationwide restructuring, the Target store was replaced by Kmart in early-mid 2021.

Transport connections
Watergardens is serviced by the adjacent Watergardens railway station, with all Metro Trains Sunbury line and some V/Line Bendigo line trains stopping at the station. Seven bus routes originate at Watergardens station, with the 476 to Moonee Ponds Junction making additional stops to the north of the main complex building and outside the homemaker centre complex.

Tenants
Tenants at the adjacent homemaker centre include Bunnings Warehouse and Harvey Norman.

See also
 Taylors Lakes, Victoria
 List of largest shopping centres in Australia

References

External links
 

Shopping centres in Melbourne
1997 establishments in Australia
Shopping malls established in 1997
Buildings and structures in the City of Brimbank